Gadon, is a village in the central Galguduud region of Somalia.

Overview
Gadon is situated in the Dusmareb District of the Galmudug state of Somalia. The village is 40km east of the capital city of Galmudug state and the administrative capital of the galguduud region, Dusmareb.

References

Populated places in Galguduud
Galmudug
Populated places in Somalia